Backeljaia najerensis is a species of air-breathing land snail, a terrestrial pulmonate gastropod mollusk in the family Geomitridae.

References

najerensis
Gastropods described in 1950